Conakry Botanical Garden is a botanical garden in Conakry, Guinea. It is located in the Camayenne part of the city, with the Ambroise Paré Hospital to the south and Conakry Grand Mosque to the north. It is noted for its kapok trees.

See also
List of buildings and structures in Guinea

References

Buildings and structures in Conakry